Woman to Woman is a 1921 play by the British writer Michael Morton. During the First World War, a British officer and a French dancer meet in a doomed romance.

Film adaptations
The play has been adapted into film on three occasions: a 1923 version directed by Graham Cutts with assistance from a young Alfred Hitchcock, a 1929 version directed by Victor Saville and a 1946 version directed by Maclean Rogers.

References

Bibliography
Rachael Low: The History of British Film: Volume VII. Routledge, 1997.

Plays by Michael Morton
1921 plays
British plays adapted into films
Plays about World War I